Petra Dugardein (born 14 April 1977) is a Dutch former international football goalkeeper. A latecomer to top level football, she played club football in the Eredivisie for Willem II and ADO Den Haag. Dugardein announced her immediate retirement from football in January 2011.

International career
On 4 May 2008, 31-year-old Dugardein debuted for the senior Netherlands women's national football team, playing the second half of a 2–2 draw with China in Emmen.

Loes Geurts played in every match as the Netherlands reached the semi-final of UEFA Women's Euro 2009, with Dugardein and Angela Christ as the understudies.

During her football career Dugardein was serving as a driver in the Royal Netherlands Army. She was part of the winning Netherlands team at the 2004 World Military Cup.

References

External links
Dugardein profile on UEFA.com

1977 births
Living people
Dutch women's footballers
Netherlands women's international footballers
Footballers from Zierikzee
Royal Netherlands Army personnel
ADO Den Haag (women) players
Willem II (women) players
Women's association football goalkeepers